Pattathu Rani is a 1967 Indian Tamil-language film directed by S. Ramanathan and written by Javar Seetharaman. The film stars Gemini Ganesan and Kalpana. It was released on 13 January 1967.

Plot

Cast 
 Gemini Ganesan
 Kalpana
 P. Bhanumathi
 Gummadi
 Nagesh
 G. Varalakshmi

Production 
Pattathu Rani was produced by Sunbeam and G. K. Combines, directed by S. Ramanathan, and written by Javar Seetharaman. Cinematography was handled by G. Vittal Rao and editing by Paul Duraisingam.

Music 
The music was composed by T. K. Ramamoorthy, and the lyrics were written by Vaali, Alangudi Somu and Thanjaivanan.

Release 
Pattathu Rani was released on 14 January 1967, during the festive occasion of Pongal, and was distributed by Venkatachalapathy Pictures. Kalki criticised the film's outdated story.

References

Bibliography

External links 
 

1960s Tamil-language films
1967 films
Films directed by S. Ramanathan
Films scored by T. K. Ramamoorthy